Shabbir Ahmed may refer to:

 Shabbir Ahmed (cricketer) (born 1976), Pakistani cricketer
 Shabbir Ahmed (lyricist), Indian Bollywood lyricist
 Shabbir Ahmed (kabaddi) (born 1983), Pakistan kabaddi player